The 2007 CONCACAF U-20 Qualifying Tournament was held to determine the four CONCACAF entrants into the 2007 FIFA U-20 World Cup, which was hosted by Canada. The tournament final was held in two groups of four with the top two from each group advancing. Group A was held in Panama and Group B was held in Mexico. On January 21, 2007, the United States and Panama qualified to the U-20 World Cup. On February 23, 2007, Mexico and Costa Rica achieved qualification as well.

Qualification 

The following teams qualified for the tournament:

Squads

Group A 

Panama hosted Group A. All of the matches were played at Estadio Rommel Fernández in Panama City between January 17–21.

Group B 

Mexico hosted Group B. All of the matches were played at Estadio Banorte in Culiacán, Sinaloa between February 21–25.

See also 

 2007 U-20 World Cup CONCACAF qualifying tournament qualifying
 CONCACAF Under-20 Championship
 2007 FIFA U-20 World Cup

External links 
 2007 CONCACAF U-20 Qualifying at CONCACAF.com
 Results by RSSSF

CONCACAF
International association football competitions hosted by Panama
International association football competitions hosted by Mexico
U-20
 
CONCACAF Under-20 Championship
2007 in youth association football